James Abram Garfield MacDonald (August 8, 1881 – November 6, 1951) was a Canadian athlete who competed mainly in the triple jump. He was born in Lower South River, Nova Scotia. He competed for Canada in the 1908 Summer Olympics held in London in the triple jump where he won the silver medal.

References

Sources

External links
 

1881 births
1951 deaths
People from Antigonish County, Nova Scotia
Canadian male triple jumpers
Olympic silver medalists for Canada
Athletes (track and field) at the 1908 Summer Olympics
Olympic track and field athletes of Canada
Sportspeople from Nova Scotia
Medalists at the 1908 Summer Olympics
Olympic silver medalists in athletics (track and field)
Olympic male high jumpers